Tara Buck (born March 16, 1975) is an American film, stage, and television actress. Buck is known for her roles in True Blood, Ray Donovan, and Party of Five.

Early life 

Buck attended Wood River High School in Hailey Idaho, where she took on her first acting roles in their theater productions.  Later, she moved to Los Angeles to attend the American Academy of Dramatic Arts.  Shortly after graduating, Buck landed her first recurring television role on the series Party of Five.

Career

Theater 
Buck has starred in numerous live theater productions including Paula Vogel's Pulitzer Prize-winning play How I Learned To Drive in 2010 and in the West Coast premiere of Ten Cent Night written by Marisa Wegrzyn in 2009. She was nominated for an Ovation Award for her performance in 2004's A Gift From Heaven.

Television 
On television, Buck is known for her recurring role as Ginger in the HBO  series True Blood. She appeared on the show from 2008 to 2014 and was promoted to series regular for the seventh and final season of the show.

In 2008 Tara also completed a motorcycle-themed drama pilot for HBO called 1% directed by Alan Taylor and written by Michael Tolkin. The show never aired on HBO due to creative conflicts from the Hells Angels founder.

Buck has made guest appearances on Bones,  The X-Files, Criminal Minds, Justified, Cold Case, Nip/Tuck, The Shield, Southland, The Closer and Bloodline.

In 2016 and 2017, Buck recurred on the fourth and fifth seasons of the Showtime series Ray Donovan with Liev Schreiber. She played patrol cop Maureen Dougherty, an LAPD patrol cop and love interest to Terry Donovan. In the show, Buck's character, Maureen, joined the Donovan family when she married Terry Donovan (Eddie Marsan) in season 5, episode 2, entitled "Las Vegas".

In 2018, Buck guest-starred as Madeline Locarno in the pilot episode for the Shondaland-produced show, For The People on ABC.

Film 

Buck was featured  in the crime thriller Tomorrow You’re Gone, in 2013, a film based on the book, Boot Tracks.

The actress has appeared in several independent feature films including the American-Italian-Mexican drama film, Medeas in 2014 with Catalina Sandino Moreno and directed by Andrea Pallaoro. The film premiered at the 70th annual Venice Film Festival, and was well received by critics. She appeared in the horror film, At the Devil's Door with Naya Rivera that premiered at the South by Southwest (SXSW) film festival in 2014.

Buck was the lead in the 2016 film Great Plains, from director [Blair Hayes] and starred in the 2016 Judd Apatow Netflix comedy film Pee-Wee's Big Holiday.

She starred in A Mother’s Escape also in 2016 for the Lifetime channel.

In 2017, Buck starred in and executive produced the film, Son of Perdition, a period drama set in the early days of the American frontier which was written and directed by Trevor Riley.

Buck had a supporting role in the crime thriller, Inherit The Viper with Josh Hartnett. The film had its world premiere at the Zurich Film Festival in 2019 and was released internationally by Lionsgate in early 2020.

Personal life 
Buck married singer/songwriter Chris Pierce in 2012. She lives in Southern California with her husband.

The actress is an outspoken feminist and has been a guest speaker for multiple events that address issues of gender inequality including, among others, "Conversations With Exceptional Women," an annual conference bringing together highly accomplished women from all professional areas to discuss female-related concerns. In addition, along those lines, Buck founded her own production company called She & I Productions.  The company, based in Los Angeles, is a film and television production company geared toward female content and its mission is a commitment to the empowerment of women both in front of and behind the camera.

Buck and her husband are co-owners of a boutique wine label called Ledbetter. Ledbetter Wines can be found in many California restaurants.

Filmography

Film

Television

Awards and nominations

References

External links 
 
 

1975 births
Living people
20th-century American actresses
21st-century American actresses
Actresses from Idaho
American film actresses
American stage actresses
American television actresses
People from Hailey, Idaho